The Book Club Bible is a non-fiction anthology of literary review, with a foreword by Lionel Shriver, whose novel We Need to Talk About Kevin has its own prominent entry. Aside from providing a synopsis for each book, the text also features background information on the author, suggested comparison volumes, a detailed historical context and starting points for group discussion. The intention of the anthology is to encourage book club members to seek out and discuss important contemporary or classical works.

Novels featured
Notes on a Scandal by Zoë Heller
The Lovely Bones by Alice Sebold
The Time Traveler's Wife by Audrey Niffenegger
Lady Chatterley's Lover by D. H. Lawrence
Rebecca by Daphne Du Maurier
The Bell Jar by Sylvia Plath
Atonement by Ian McEwan
A Clockwork Orange by Anthony Burgess

References

2007 books
American anthologies
Book review